RNB España is an annual national competition in Spain that selects Spanish representatives to compete in major men pageants: Mister Supranational , Mister International , Mister Global and Caballero Universal. In 2022, RNB España produced their first female beauty pageant which select Spain's representatives to Miss Supranational.

Background 
Reinado Nacional de Belleza® España was founded on September 12, 2019, by current co-presidents Mr. Jesús Bueno and Mr. Juan Delgado, with former Miss Universe Spain 2018, Ángela Ponce. RNB® España obtained franchised of Mister International on September 30, 2019. On October 20, 2019, RNB obtained the obtained franchised of Mister Supranational.

International crowns

 
 One – Mister Global winners: 
Miguel Ángel Lucas Carrasco (2021)

Cristhian Naranjo Gómez (2021)

Mister RNB España 
First edition of Mister RNB España were held in Periana, Málaga from September 12 to 19 2021. The winners were Mister RNB España Supranational; Manuel Ndele of Burgos,  Mister RNB España Internacional; Juan Pablo Colías González of Valladolid, Mister RNB España Global; Miguel Ángel Lucas Carrasco of Toledo and Mister RNB España Caballero Universal; Cristhian Naranjo Gómez of Alicante.  Cantabria's Fernando Gutiérrez Romano was 1st Runner-Up and Coruña's David Souto Naveiro was 2nd Runner-Up.

2nd edition (2022) 

On 26 April 2022, RNB España announced that Nerja, Málaga, on the Costa del Sol, will host Mister RNB España 2022 from Sunday, July 31 to Sunday, August 7. During the week, all official representatives will enjoy various sights of Nerja. The Finals will be held at the Auditorio de los Jardines de la Cueva de Nerja on Saturday, August 6, at 10:00 p.m, with free admission.

Editions 
The following is a list of Mister RNB España pageant editions and information.

Titleholders

Miss RNB España 
The First edition of Miss RNB España was held in Torrox, Málaga from May 22 to 29 2022.

Editions 
The following is a list of Miss RNB España pageant editions and information.

Titleholders

RNB España Representatives
The following is a list of all RNB España Representatives and titleholders until now.

See also 
 List of beauty contests

References 

International beauty pageants
Recurring events established in 2019
Recurring events established in 2021
2019 establishments in Spain
2021 establishments in Spain

Male beauty pageants
Beauty pageants